Leonardo Sottani (born 1 November 1973 in Figline Valdarno) is a retired water polo player from Italy, who represented his native country at the 1996 Summer Olympics in Atlanta, Georgia. There the attacking forward (1m97) was a member of the men's national team that claimed the bronze medal. He participated at the 1996, 2000, and 2008 Summer Olympics representing the Italian National Waterpolo team. 

He played for the most successful waterpolo team in the world, Pro Recco, and helped the team win the Italian League and Coppa Italia in 2006 and 2007. He also played for RN Florentia.

See also
 Italy men's Olympic water polo team records and statistics
 List of Olympic medalists in water polo (men)
 List of men's Olympic water polo tournament top goalscorers

References
RAI profile
 Pallanuoto Page at Italy's 2008 Olympic Team Website

1973 births
Living people
Italian male water polo players
Water polo players at the 1996 Summer Olympics
Water polo players at the 2000 Summer Olympics
Water polo players at the 2008 Summer Olympics
Olympic water polo players of Italy
Olympic bronze medalists for Italy
Olympic medalists in water polo
Medalists at the 1996 Summer Olympics
Sportspeople from the Metropolitan City of Florence